Norman Foster Darrell "Norm" Alvis (born July 12, 1963 in Sacramento, California) is a former professional (and current amateur) American cyclist. He was professional from 1989 to 1998. He won dozens of races as a junior and amateur and professional and masters racer. He competed in the team time trial at the 1988 Summer Olympics.

Major results
1987
 1st  Time trial, National Road Championships
1989
 1st Gastown Grand Prix
1991
 1st Stage 1 Bayern Rundfahrt
1992
 4th Giro del Lazio
 4th GP de Fourmies
1993
 6th Grand Prix d'Isbergues
 6th Paris–Camembert
1995
 1st  Road race, National Road Championships
 1st Philadelphia International Championship
 1st Stage 3 Herald Sun Tour
 1st Stage 4 Tour de Taiwan
 2nd Overall Cascade Cycling Classic
1997
 1st  Overall Herald Sun Tour
1st Stages 4, 11 & 13
 1st  Overall Tour de Toona
1st Stage 3
 2nd Time trial, National Road Championships
1998
 2nd Time trial, National Road Championships

US Hour Record Holder
1997: 51.505 kilometers.  Record stood until September 16, 2016

Grand Tour results
Source:

Tour de France
1990: 142nd

Giro d'Italia
1990: 127th
1992: 143rd
1993: 127th

References

1963 births
Living people
American male cyclists
Cyclists from California
Sportspeople from Sacramento, California
Olympic cyclists of the United States
Cyclists at the 1988 Summer Olympics